Charles James Showers (12 January 1848 – date of death unknown) was an English first-class cricketer.

The son of Major–General St George Daniel Showers, he was born in January 1848 at Fort William in British India. He was educated in England at Cheltenham College and Wellington College. He made his debut in first-class cricket for the South in the North v South fixture of 1877 at Hull. Four years later, he made two further first-class appearances for the Marylebone Cricket Club against Kent and Hampshire, with both matches played at Lord's. He later became a tea planter in Assam.

References

External links

1848 births
Date of death unknown
People from Kolkata
People educated at Cheltenham College
People educated at Wellington College, Berkshire
English cricketers
North v South cricketers
Marylebone Cricket Club cricketers
English merchants
Businesspeople in tea